Marcos Ignacio Ledesma (born 15 September 1996) is an Argentine professional footballer who plays as a goalkeeper for Platense on loan from Defensa y Justicia.

Career
Ledesma joined Quilmes' system in 2011, signing from Estudiantes. He was a first-team player for the 2014, 2015, 2016 and 2016–17 seasons but didn't make an appearance in the Primera División, though was on the substitutes bench seventeen times. He was an unused substitute on a further ten occasions in 2017–18, before his professional debut eventually arrived against Instituto in Primera B Nacional on 2 December 2017. Another appearance versus Juventud Unida came a week later, as the club went on to secure twelfth place. After thirty-eight appearances, Ledesma was signed by Defensa y Justicia on 5 August 2020.

On 3 January 2022, Ledesma joined Platense on a one-year loan with a purchase option.

Career statistics
.

References

External links

1996 births
Living people
People from Río Cuarto, Córdoba
Argentine footballers
Association football goalkeepers
Primera Nacional players
Quilmes Atlético Club footballers
Defensa y Justicia footballers
Club Atlético Platense footballers
Sportspeople from Córdoba Province, Argentina